Valentin Aleksandrovich Gavrilov (26 July 1946 – 23 December 2003) was a Russian high jumper who won a bronze medal at the 1968 Olympics. That year he also finished second at the European Indoor Games, but in 1969–70 he won his all international competitions, including European championships (indoor and outdoor) and the Universiade.

References

1946 births
2003 deaths
Soviet male high jumpers
Russian male high jumpers
Olympic bronze medalists for the Soviet Union
Athletes (track and field) at the 1968 Summer Olympics
Olympic athletes of the Soviet Union
Dynamo sports society athletes
European Athletics Championships medalists
Medalists at the 1968 Summer Olympics
Olympic bronze medalists in athletics (track and field)
Universiade medalists in athletics (track and field)
Universiade gold medalists for the Soviet Union
Medalists at the 1970 Summer Universiade
Medalists at the 1973 Summer Universiade